Fuld may refer to the former English name of Fulda, a city in Hesse, Germany.

As a German-Jewish family name it may refer to:
 Bracha Fuld, German-born Jewish resistance fighter
 Dick Fuld, banker and executive; former CEO of Lehman Brothers
 Hillel Fuld, American Israeli blogger, vlogger, business advisor and speaker 
 Leo Fuld, Dutch singer
 Sam Fuld, American major league baseball outfielder
 Stanley H. Fuld, American lawyer and politician
 William Fuld, American entrepreneur

See also

 Fould family
 Fulda (people)